Mount Charlton is a rural locality in the Mackay Region, Queensland, Australia.

Geography 
There are two neighbourhoods in the locality:

 Camerons Pocket is a 
 Kungurri

The locality has the following mountains:

 Crazy Cat Mountain 
 Mount Charlton 
 The Pinnacle

and the following passes:

 Camerons Gap
 Kungurri Gap
 St Helens Gap

History 
Mount Charlton State School opened on 4 March 1931. It was mothballed on 31 December 2009 and closed on 31 December 2010. It was at 2342 Mirani-Mount Ossa Road. The school's website was archived.

The Silent Grove Provisional School opened on 29 August 1928. On 3 February 1936 the Silent Grove Upper State School opened. In 1938, the Silent Grove Provisional School closed, being replaced by the Mount Ossa State School in neighbouring Mount Ossa. The Silent Grove Upper State School closed about 1964. Silent Grove Upper State School was at 2948 Mirani-Mount Ossa Road.

References 

Mackay Region
Localities in Queensland